The Autosan Eurolider 12 is an intercity coach manufactured by the Polish company Autosan SA. The bus belongs to the Eurolider product family. Buses manufactured for the UK market are known as Autosan EuroLeader 12 RHD. The Eurolider 12 uses a Cummins ISBe6.7E5 Euro 5 diesel engine.

Technical sheets

See also 

 List of buses

References

Buses
Coaches (bus)